José Prieto (born 22 July 1949) is a Cuban cyclist. He competed in the individual road race at the 1972 Summer Olympics.

References

External links
 

1949 births
Living people
Cuban male cyclists
Olympic cyclists of Cuba
Cyclists at the 1972 Summer Olympics
Place of birth missing (living people)
Pan American Games medalists in cycling
Pan American Games silver medalists for Cuba
Cyclists at the 1975 Pan American Games
Medalists at the 1975 Pan American Games